Wora is a village in northern Ivory Coast. It is in the sub-prefecture of Kouto, Kouto Department, Bagoué Region, Savanes District. Wora is located 26 kilometres northeast of Kouto.

Populated places in Savanes District
Populated places in Bagoué